Bonnie Owens (October 1, 1929 – April 24, 2006), born Bonnie Campbell, was an American country music singer who was married to Buck Owens and later Merle Haggard.

Biography
She was born Bonnie Campbell in Blanchard, Oklahoma, United States. She met Buck Owens when she was 15. They played in a band in Mesa, Arizona, and married in 1948. They were the parents of musician Buddy Alan. They moved to Bakersfield by 1951 and started music careers. They divorced in 1953.

Bonnie Owens's first recording was "A Dear John Letter", a duet with Fuzzy Owen on Mar-Vel Records (#MV-102) in 1953. The B-side contained the song "Wonderful World".

Owens recorded on numerous labels during the 1950s and early 1960s, including Merle Haggard’s and Fuzzy Owen's own Tally label, all of which were singles. Her first album titled Don't Take Advantage of Me came in 1965 on Capitol Records # ST-2403.

Owens had hits on the country chart in the early 1960s with the songs "Why Don't Daddy Live Here Anymore?" and "Don't Take Advantage of Me". In 1965, Haggard and Owens recorded the song "Just Between the Two of Us", a duet, and probably Owens's best known hit. It is also the title song to their 1966 duet album on Capitol Records (#ST-2453), that was recorded with The Strangers.

Bonnie Owens was named Female Vocalist of the Year in 1965 by the Academy of Country Music. She and Haggard married the same year. From this point, Owens dedicated her time to Haggard's children and his career, touring with Merle's band The Strangers as a backup vocalist.

Owens and Haggard divorced in 1978; after a brief hiatus, she continued touring with him.

On April 24, 2006, Owens died at the age of 76, in hospice for Alzheimer's disease.

Discography

Albums

Singles

References

External links
 Bonnie Owens at CMT.com

1929 births
2006 deaths
American women country singers
American country singer-songwriters
Singer-songwriters from Oklahoma
X Records artists
People from Blanchard, Oklahoma
20th-century American singers
20th-century American women singers
Country musicians from Oklahoma
The Strangers (American band) members
21st-century American women